Lebetus scorpioides is a species of fish belonging to the family Gobiidae.

It is native to the coasts of Northwestern Europe.

References

Gobiidae